MacTCP was the standard TCP/IP implementation for the classic Mac OS through version 7.5.1. It was the first application-independent implementation of a TCP stack for a non-Unix platform and predates Winsock by over 5 years. Released in 1988, it is considered obsolete and has reliability issues and incomplete features that sometimes prevent it from operating properly on the modern Internet. In addition, the API was unique to the Mac OS, and at least one developer released a Berkeley Sockets-derived API to make porting from other platforms easier. 

It was originally a substantial purchase, carrying a $2,500 price tag for a site license, with an additional $2,500 fee for commercial use. The price was lowered until by the mid-1990s it sold for $60. MacTCP was not included free with Mac OS until System 7.5, when the rising popularity of the Internet made it a necessity. Apple replaced it in 1995 with Open Transport, which had an improved interface for user configuration, although MacTCP remained in use on older systems due to its generally lower system requirements.

External links
 MacTCP Manual
 MacTCP setup guide with screenshots
 MacTCP programmer documentation

References

Macintosh operating systems APIs